Juan Francisco García (28 March 1953 – 8 January 2023) was a Mexican boxer. He competed in the men's featherweight event at the 1972 Summer Olympics.

García died in Mexico City on 8 January 2023, at the age of 69.

References

1953 births
2023 deaths
Mexican male boxers
Olympic boxers of Mexico
Boxers at the 1972 Summer Olympics
Boxers at the 1971 Pan American Games
Pan American Games gold medalists for Mexico
Pan American Games medalists in boxing
Place of birth missing
Featherweight boxers
Medalists at the 1971 Pan American Games
20th-century Mexican people
21st-century Mexican people